Pimelea urvilleana subsp. urvilleana, commonly known as pinatoro, is a ground spreading shrub native to New Zealand.

References

urvilleana subsp. urvilleana
Flora of New Zealand
Plant subspecies